The National Soccer League Player of the Year was an annual soccer award present to the most outstanding player in Australia's National Soccer League. The award was established in the NSL's first season in 1977 and it ran until 1989. The following season it was replaced by the Johnny Warren Medal.

The inaugural winner was Jimmy Rooney of Marconi, who finished second that season. The last winner of the award was Zlatko Nastevski, who played for table-toppers Marconi when he won the award. Bobby Russell and Frank Farina are the only people to have won the award twice.

From 1977 until 1985 the vote was purely done by referees. Then, between 1986 and 1988, two winners were announced, one voted by the referees and one voted by the players. In 1989, it was only the players voting.

Winners 

* Player-voted award  Referee-voted award

Multiple winners

Awards won by club

References 

National Soccer League (Australia)
Awards established in 1977
1977 establishments in Australia
Association football player of the year awards
Australian soccer trophies and awards